Politainment, a portmanteau word  composed of politics and entertainment, describes tendencies in politics and mass media to liven up political reports and news coverage using elements from public relations to create a new kind of political communication. Politainment, while outwardly emphasizing the political aspects of the information communicated, nevertheless draws heavily upon techniques from pop culture and journalism to make complex information more accessible or convincing and distract public attention from politically unfavorable topics. The interdependencies of politicians and media are known as the politico-media complex.

Of doubtful virtue, declining amounts of content and substance can easily be compensated by giving news stories a sensationalistic twinge. Politainment thus ranges on the same level as edu- and infotainment.

Typical catchlines in politainment reports or media will at times bluntly argue ad hominem in a generalizing manner and try to emphasize virtues and charisma ("xyz will Make America Great Again") or vices and weaknesses (by denunciation: "xyz will wreck this country", "lynching", etc.). The latter example is also known as fear appeal. More moderate forms make extensive use of imprecise, metaphoric language (allegories, metonymy, periphrases, kennings etc.).

Politainment can be both a communication aspect of (1) politicians and spin doctors to their and their party's own advantage and the political adversary's disadvantage or (2) a strategy for news publishers, journalists, etc., to promote their medium and journalistic work. 

Politainment may be a factor in party identification, mass-influencing voter's choices, it has thus become an indispensable tool in political campaigns and elections. As such it can also be one of the—seemingly innocuous—ingredients of crowd manipulation up to political psychological warfare.

Quotes

See also

Agitator
Amusing Ourselves to Death
Anti-intellectualism in American Life
Fake news
Fox Nation
Grassroots
Just How Stupid Are We?
Misinformation
Panem et circenses
Political satire
Populism
Propaganda
Steve Colbert
Yellow press

References

Literature

Criticism of journalism
Entertainment
Propaganda techniques